This is a list of museums in the Gambia.

List 
 African Heritage Museum
 Katchikally Museum and Crocodile Pool
 Tanje Village Museum
 The Gambia National Museum

See also 
 List of museums

External links 
 Museums in the Gambia

 
Gambia
Museums
Museums
Museums
Gambia